Tonio may refer to:

Tonio (film), a 2016 Dutch film
Tonio (software), a Vocaloid vocal
Tonio Kröger, a novella by Thomas Mann 
Tonio Kröger (film), a film based on the novella
Tonio (app), an audio-decoding-app 
Tonio (name), persons with this given name or nickname
Tonio Trussardi, a character in JoJo’s Bizarre Adventure Diamond is Unbreakable by Hirohiko Araki

See also

Antonio